Spain participated in the Eurovision Song Contest 2017 with the song "Do It for Your Lover" written by Manel Navarro and Antonio Rayo "Rayito". The song was performed by Manel Navarro. The Spanish broadcaster Televisión Española (TVE) organised the national final Objetivo Eurovisión 2017 in order to select the Spanish entry for the 2017 contest in Kyiv, Ukraine. Six artists and songs, one of which was selected through the wildcard round Eurocasting, competed in the televised show where an in-studio jury and a public vote selected "Do It for Your Lover" performed by Manel Navarro as the winner.

As a member of the "Big Five", Spain automatically qualified to compete in the final of the Eurovision Song Contest. Performing in position 16, Spain placed twenty-sixth (last) out of the 26 participating countries with 5 points.

Background 

The nation has won the contest on two occasions: in 1968 with the song "La, la, la" performed by Massiel and in 1969 with the song "Vivo cantando" performed by Salomé, the latter having won in a four-way tie with France, the Netherlands and the United Kingdom. Spain has also finished second four times, with Karina in 1971, Mocedades in 1973, Betty Missiego in 1979 and Anabel Conde in 1995. In 2016, Spain placed twenty-second with the song "Say Yay!" performed by Barei.

The Spanish national broadcaster, Televisión Española (TVE), broadcasts the event within Spain and organises the selection process for the nation's entry. TVE confirmed their intentions to participate at the 2017 Eurovision Song Contest on 14 September 2016. In 2016, TVE organised the national final Objetivo Eurovisión featuring a competition among several artists and songs to select both the artist and song that would represent Spain, a procedure which was continued for their 2017 entry.

Before Eurovision

Eurocasting 
A submission period for the wildcard round was open from 27 October 2016 until 27 November 2016. At the conclusion of the submission period, 392 entries were received. Professionals at RTVE Digital, the digital branch of the broadcaster, evaluated the entries received and selected thirty entries for an Internet vote. The selected entries were revealed via TVE's official website on 1 December 2016. Among the competing artists was Javi Soleil who represented Spain in the Eurovision Song Contest 2007 as part of D'Nash.

Selection 
In the first stage, Internet users had between 2 and 12 December 2016 to vote for their favourite song on TVE's official website. Votes from 55,264 users were received at the conclusion of the voting, and the top ten entries that qualified for the second stage were announced on 15 December 2016 on the special webcast show Spain Calling, presented by Irene Mahía and Paloma G. Quirós, that was also broadcast on TVE's official website. The three entries were announced on 20 December 2016 on Spain Calling.

Concert show 
The concert show, broadcast online on TVE's official website, took place on 12 January 2017 at the Ciudad de la Imagen in Pozuelo de Alarcón, Community of Madrid, hosted by Irene Mahía and Paloma G. Quirós. The three entries that qualified from the second stage competed and "Ouch!!" performed by LeKlein was selected for the national final exclusively through an Internet vote via TVE's official website and TVE's official Eurovision app. In addition to the performances of the competing entries, guest performers included David Rees and former Eurovision contestant Azúcar Moreno which represented Spain in 1990. The remaining five competing acts of the national final were also announced during the show.

Objetivo Eurovisión 2017 
Objetivo Eurovisión 2017 was the national final organised by TVE that took place on 11 February 2017 at the VAV studios in Leganés, Community of Madrid, hosted by Jaime Cantizano. The show was broadcast on La 1 as well as online via TVE's official website rtve.es. Six artists and songs, one of which was selected through a wildcard round called Eurocasting that consisted of three stages which commenced on 2 December 2016 and concluded with a winning song and artist during a concert show on 12 January 2017, competed with the winner being decided upon through a combination of public voting and an in-studio expert jury. The national final was watched by 1.449 million viewers in Spain with a market share of 8.9%. The three members of the in-studio jury that evaluated the entries during the final were: 

  – Radio program director and presenter at Los 40

 Javier Cárdenas – Radio program director and presenter at Europa FM, television program director and host at La 1
  – Radio program director and presenter at Radio 3, television program director and presenter at La 2

Final 
The televised final took place on 11 February 2017. The running order for the six participating entries was announced on 2 February 2017. In addition to the performances of the competing entries, guest performers included Roko, Edu Soto and former Eurovision contestants Karina, David Civera and Barei which represented Spain in 1971, 2001 and 2016, respectively. The winner, "Do It for Your Lover" performed by Manel Navarro, was selected through the combination of the votes of an in-studio jury (50%) and a public vote via telephone, SMS and TVE's official Eurovision app (50%). Since Manel Navarro and Mirela were tied at 58 points, the jury declared Navarro as the winner following a tie-break voting round. Two of the three jury members voted in favour of Manel Navarro.

Controversy 
During the tie-break voting round of Objetivo Eurovisión 2017, when the jury selected Manel Navarro over the public vote's favourite Mirela, and before his reprise performance, loud boos and accusations of rigging could be heard, which resulted in uneasy moments: Manel Navarro responded with a bras d'honneur as he was being booed while on stage. He would apologise for the gesture two days later during a TVE press conference. The selection of Xavi Martínez as a jury member, who voted for Navarro during the tie-break voting round, was later challenged over potential conflict of interest since he had promoted Navarro and his song on his radio program on Los 40. In February 2017, members of the Spanish Parliament José Miguel Camacho and Ricardo Sixto placed motions to request TVE for clarification on the details of the selection process for Eurovision and on the possibility of nullifying the results of the national final. On 22 February 2017, TVE's Head of Entertainment and organiser of the national final Toñi Prieto was summoned to appear before TVE's Audit Committee to clarify allegations of mishandling.

TVE issued a statement on 26 February 2017, stating that the selection process had been conducted following the regulations set by the European Broadcasting Union and that all candidates had accepted the rules at every stage of the process. The statement also defended the criteria of the jury members, stating that, as music radio hosts from the three main media groups in the country, it is "evident" that they "usually have contact with artists, singers and music producers for professional reasons".

Preparation
The official video of the song, directed by Mauri D. Galiano, was filmed in February 2017 on the north coast of Tenerife, Canary Islands. The video premiered on 9 March 2017, which served as the official preview video for the Spanish entry.

Promotion
Manel Navarro made appearances across Europe to specifically promote "Do It for Your Lover" as the Spanish Eurovision entry. On 18 February and 5 March, Manel Navarro performed "Do It for Your Lover" during the third semi-final of the Ukrainian Eurovision national final and the final of the Romanian Eurovision national final, respectively. On 2 April, he performed during the London Eurovision Party, which was held at the Café de Paris venue in London, United Kingdom and hosted by Nicki French and Paddy O'Connell. Between 3 and 6 April, Navarro took part in promotional activities in Tel Aviv, Israel and performed during the Israel Calling event held at the Ha'teatron venue. On 8 April, he performed during the Eurovision in Concert event which was held at the Melkweg venue in Amsterdam, Netherlands and hosted by Cornald Maas and Selma Björnsdóttir. Navarro also took part in promotional activities in Portugal on 26 and 27 April where he appeared during the RTP1 talk show 5 Para A Meia-Noite.

In addition to his international appearances, he performed the song on the talk show ¡Qué tiempo tan feliz! on Telecinco on 25 February.<ref>{{cite web|date=25 February 2017|title=Manel Navarro interpreta en '¡Qué tiempo tan feliz!' su eurovisiva canción|trans-title=Manel Navarro performs his Eurovision song on ¡Qué tiempo tan feliz!'|url=http://www.telecinco.es/quetiempotanfeliz/actuaciones/Manel-Navarro-interpreta-eurovisiva-cancion_2_2329980096.html|access-date=26 February 2017|website=telecinco.es|publisher=Telecinco|language=es}}</ref> On 15 April, Navarro performed during the Eurovision Spain Pre-Party'', which was held at the Sala La Riviera venue in Madrid. On 25 April, a farewell party was held for Navarro before he travelled to Kyiv for the contest, which took place at the Ukrainian Embassy in Madrid, hosted by Ambassador Anatoly Scherba.

At Eurovision 

According to Eurovision rules, all nations with the exceptions of the host country and the "Big Five" (France, Germany, Italy, Spain and the United Kingdom) are required to qualify from one of two semi-finals in order to compete for the final; the top ten countries from each semi-final progress to the final. As a member of the "Big Five", Spain automatically qualified to compete in the final on 13 May 2017. In addition to their participation in the final, Spain is also required to broadcast and vote in one of the two semi-finals. During the semi-final allocation draw on 31 January 2017, Spain was assigned to broadcast and vote in the first semi-final on 9 May 2017.

In Spain, the semi-finals were broadcast on La 2 and the final was broadcast on La 1 with commentary by José María Íñigo and Julia Varela. The Spanish spokesperson, who announced the top 12-point score awarded by the Spanish jury during the final, was Nieves Álvarez.

Final 
Manel Navarro took part in technical rehearsals on 5 and 7 May, followed by dress rehearsals on 8, 12 and 13 May. This included the semi-final jury show on 8 May where an extended clip of the Spanish performance was filmed for broadcast during the live show on 9 May and the jury final on 12 May where the professional juries of each country watched and voted on the competing entries. After technical rehearsals were held on 7 May, the "Big Five" countries and host country Ukraine held a press conference. As part of this press conference, the artists took part in a draw to determine which half of the grand final they would subsequently participate in. Spain was drawn to compete in the second half. Following the conclusion of the second semi-final, the shows' producers decided upon the running order of the final. The running order for the semi-finals and final was decided by the shows' producers rather than through another draw, so that similar songs were not placed next to each other. Spain was subsequently placed to perform in position 16, following the entry from Greece and before the entry from Norway.

The Spanish performance featured Manel Navarro on stage wearing a Hawaiian shirt, joined by two backing vocalists, two guitarists and a drummer dressed in surfer outfits. The background LED screens displayed a red and white recreational vehicle, surf boards, palm trees, and yellow and red beach umbrellas. The stage director for the performance was Hans Pannecoucke. The two backing vocalists that joined Manel Navarro were Álex González and Alejandro de los Santos, while the musicians were Edgar Regincos, Marc Montserrat and Pol Niubó. Spain placed twenty-sixth (last) in the final, scoring 5 points, 5 points from the televoting and 0 points from the juries. TVE indirectly blamed Navarro's voice crack during the performance as the reason for the nation's last place, which was criticized by Spanish media.

Voting 
Voting during the three shows involved each country awarding two sets of points from 1-8, 10 and 12: one from their professional jury and the other from televoting. Each nation's jury consisted of five music industry professionals who are citizens of the country they represent, with their names published before the contest to ensure transparency. This jury judged each entry based on: vocal capacity; the stage performance; the song's composition and originality; and the overall impression by the act. In addition, no member of a national jury was permitted to be related in any way to any of the competing acts in such a way that they cannot vote impartially and independently. The individual rankings of each jury member as well as the nation's televoting results were released shortly after the grand final.

Below is a breakdown of points awarded to Spain and awarded by Spain in the first semi-final and grand final of the contest, and the breakdown of the jury voting and televoting conducted during the two shows:

Points awarded to Spain

Points awarded by Spain

Detailed voting results
The following members comprised the Spanish jury:
 David Civera (jury chairperson)singer, represented Spain in the 2001 contest
 Paula Fernández Vázquez (Paula Rojo)singer
 Rubén Villanuevacomposer, producer
 radio DJ
 Natalia Rodríguez Gallego (Natalia)singer

Notes and references

Notes

References

External links
 Official TVE Eurovision site

2017
Countries in the Eurovision Song Contest 2017
Eurovision
Eurovision